Alona is a genus of plants in the Solanaceae or nightshade family native to Chile.  It is often considered to be a subgenus within the genus Nolana.

References

External links
 Germplasm Resources Information Network
 Alona

Solanoideae
Solanaceae genera